Corleggy Cheeses is an Irish cheese producer in County Cavan. It was started by Silke Cropp in 1985 using milk from her own goat herd. Today Corleggy make a variety of different cheese from goat's milk, sheep's milk and cow's milk sourced from local farmers.

Varieties
Corleggy make two varieties of goat's cheese, one variety of sheep's cheese and five varieties of cow's cheese marketed under the "Drumlin" brand. The herds graze on neighbouring farms on drumlin pastures along the River Erne. The goat's cheese is made from pasteurised milk while the range of cow's cheese is made with raw milk. Vegetarian rennet is used, and for some varieties seawater is used to wash the cheese in salt water and helps form the edible rind.

Corleggy
Corleggy is a hard cheese handmade from raw goat's milk. Every individual cheese is matured from eight weeks to four months, depending on the season, weather, and humidity, and the seasonality of the grass and herbs available to the goats at the time of making the cheese. The rind of Corleggy is natural, formed by bathing the cheeses in sea salt brine. On occasion, a smoked version of Corleggy is available.

Quivvy
This is a soft goat's cheese preserved in Greek kalamata olive oil along with sun-dried tomatoes. It is only available from April to October.

Creeny
Creeny is a hard cheese handmade from raw sheep's milk. On occasion, a smoked version of Creeny is available.

Drumlin
Drumlin cheese is a hard cheese made from raw cow's milk and matured for a minimum of six weeks.  Young cheeses have a mild taste, getting stronger as the cheese matures. The rind is edible.
 Drumlin Traditional - This is the traditional unflavoured variety of Drumlin.
 Drumlin Garlic and Red Pepper - This cheese is flavoured with garlic and red pepper.
 Drumlin Cumin Seed - This cheese is flavoured with whole cumin seeds.
 Drumlin Smoked - This cheese is smoked with beechwood.
 Drumlin Peppercorn - This cheese is flavoured with whole green peppercorns.

Awards
 2016 - Super Gold award at the World Cheese Awards for "Best Irish Cheese" 
 2011 - Gold star award at the Great Taste Awards for Creeny, two Gold star award for Corleggy hard goats' milk cheese and Gold star award for Corleggy Kid
 2010 - Silver medal at the World Cheese Awards for Creeny, in the Hard ewes' milk cheese plain category
 2007 - gold medal at the British Cheese Awards for Creeny

See also

References

External links
 

Goat's-milk cheeses
Irish cheeses
Cow's-milk cheeses
Sheep's-milk cheeses